The Virgin Islands National Guard (VING) was federally recognized on October 19, 1973 in a ceremony officiated by Major General La Vern E. Weber, Director of the United States Army National Guard. Major Leayle Galiber was appointed acting Adjutant General and took command of the first two units to be activated, a Headquarters Detachment and the 661st Military Police Company both on St. Croix.

The U.S. Virgin Islands National Guard consists of the:

Virgin Islands Army National Guard
661st Military Police Company
Virgin Islands Air National Guard
 285th Civil Engineering Squadron

History
The Virgin Islands National Guard was federally recognized on October 19, 1973 and has largely engaged in disaster response and relief. Its first foreign deployment was when it was deployed for Operation Joint Endeavor in 1995 and has since been deployed to Iraq, Afghanistan, Kuwait, Kosovo, Haiti, and Cuba.

Decorations
The Virgin Islands National Guard has authorized several state decorations for wear by its personnel, including:
Virgin Islands Distinguished Service Medal (VIDSM)
Virgin Islands Meritorious Service Medal (VIMSM)
Virgin Islands Commendation Medal (VICOM)
Virgin Islands Long and Faithful Service Medal (VILFSM)
Virgin Islands Emergency Service Ribbon (VIESR)

References

National Guard (United States)
Military in the United States Virgin Islands
1973 establishments in the United States Virgin Islands